Manuel López Escámez (born 25 November 1985), commonly known as Manolo, is a Spanish footballer who plays for Racing Murcia FC as a central midfielder.

Club career
Born in Bullas, Region of Murcia, Manolo graduated from Ciudad de Murcia's youth setup, and made his senior debuts with the reserves, playing several seasons in the regional leagues. In the 2006 summer he was promoted to the main squad, in Segunda División.

On 2 September 2006 Manolo played his first professional match, coming on as a late substitute in a 0–2 away loss against Xerez CD. He scored his first goal on 5 May of the following year, netting his side's only in a 1–1 draw at Hércules CF.

On 2 August 2007 Manolo moved to Rayo Vallecano in Segunda División B. After appearing rarely in his first campaign, which ended in promotion, he still managed to appear in 14 matches during his second (only two starts, however).

On 1 September 2009 Manolo left the Madrid outfit and joined CD Toledo, in the third level. He subsequently resumed his career in the lower leagues, representing CD Roquetas, CD Bullense, UCAM Murcia CF, FC Jumilla, Real Murcia and Racing Murcia FC.

References

External links

1985 births
Living people
Spanish footballers
Footballers from the Region of Murcia
Association football midfielders
Segunda División players
Segunda División B players
Tercera División players
Ciudad de Murcia footballers
Rayo Vallecano players
CD Toledo players
CD Roquetas footballers
UCAM Murcia CF players
FC Jumilla players
Racing Murcia FC players